The 2015–16 Goa Professional League is the 18th season of top-tier football in the Indian state of Goa. It began on 23 August 2015. Salgaocar F.C. are the defending champions.

Teams

Table

Top scorers

References

External links 
Goa Professional League 2015-2016
Goa Pro League page at Goa Football Association website

Goa Professional League seasons
4